This page lists the albums that reached number-one on the Top R&B/Hip-Hop Albums and Top Rap Albums charts in 2007. The Rap Albums chart partially serves as a distillation of rap-specific titles from the overall R&B/Hip-Hop Albums chart.

The best performing R&B/hip-hop album of the year was Kingdom Come by Jay-Z, which had topped both charts in December 2006.

Chart history

See also
2007 in music
2007 in hip hop music
List of number-one R&B singles of 2007 (U.S.)
List of Billboard 200 number-one albums of 2007

References 

2007
2007
United States RandB Hip Hop Albums